Atkyns is a surname. Notable people with the surname include:

 Charlotte Atkyns (1757–1836), English actor and agent
 Edward Atkyns (judge) (1587–1669), English judge and baron of the exchequer of the Commonwealth period
Edward Atkyns (politician) (c. 1630–1698), his son, English lawyer and politician
 John Tracy Atkyns (died 1773), English barrister-at-law and compiler of the Atkyns' Reports
 Robert Atkyns (disambiguation), multiple people, including:
Robert Atkyns (judge) (1621–1707), English judge and baron of the Exchequer
Robert Atkyns (topographer) (1647–1711), English antiquary and historian
 Richard Atkyns (1615–1677), English writer on printing

See also
Atkins (disambiguation)